New Stoke Newington Shul is a Masorti Jewish congregation in Stoke Newington in the London Borough of Hackney. Its part-time rabbi (since 2015) is Roni Tabick. Its members include the Labour life peer Lord Glasman and the journalist Jonathan Freedland.

The community was established in 2007 as the Haringey/Stoke Newington Masorti Group. Services are held twice a month, in members' homes and local community centres.

References

External links
 Official website
 Masorti Judaism: New Stoke Newington Shul
 History of Judaism in Stoke Newington

2007 establishments in England
Masorti synagogues in the United Kingdom
Religion in the London Borough of Hackney
Religious organizations established in 2007
Stoke Newington
Synagogues in London